Paris Run is a  long 1st order tributary to Harmon Creek in Washington County, Pennsylvania.  This is the only stream of this names in the United States.

Course
Paris Run rises at Paris, Pennsylvania, and then flows south, straddling the West Virginia-Pennsylvania Stateline to join Harmon Creek about 2 miles east of Colliers, West Virginia.

Watershed
Paris Run drains  of area, receives about 40.1 in/year of precipitation, has a wetness index of 330.65, and is about 60% forested.

See also
List of rivers of Pennsylvania
List of rivers of West Virginia

References

Rivers of Pennsylvania
Rivers of West Virginia
Rivers of Washington County, Pennsylvania
Rivers of Brooke County, West Virginia
Rivers of Hancock County, West Virginia